The Andersonville National Historic Site, located near Andersonville, Georgia, preserves the former Andersonville Prison (also known as Camp Sumter), a Confederate prisoner-of-war camp during the final fourteen months of the American Civil War. Most of the site lies in southwestern Macon County, adjacent to the east side of the town of Andersonville. The site also contains the Andersonville National Cemetery and the National Prisoner of War Museum. The prison was created in February 1864 and served until April 1865.

The site was commanded by Captain Henry Wirz, who was tried and executed after the war for war crimes. The prison was overcrowded to four times its capacity, and had an inadequate water supply, inadequate food, and unsanitary conditions. Of the approximately 45,000 Union prisoners held at Camp Sumter during the war, nearly 13,000 died. The chief causes of death were scurvy, diarrhea and dysentery.

Conditions 

There were two entrances on the west side of the stockade, known as "north entrance" and "south entrance". This allows for a space of about 5 feet by 6 feet (1.5 x 2 m) for each prisoner.

Descriptions of Andersonville 

Robert H. Kellogg, sergeant major in the 16th Regiment Connecticut Volunteers, described his entry as a prisoner into the prison camp, May 2, 1864:

As we entered the place, a spectacle met our eyes that almost froze our blood with horror, and made our hearts fail within us. Before us were forms that had once been active and erect;—stalwart men, now nothing but mere walking skeletons, covered with filth and vermin. Many of our men, in the heat and intensity of their feeling, exclaimed with earnestness. "Can this be hell?" "God protect us!" and all thought that he alone could bring them out alive from so terrible a place. In the center of the whole was a swamp, occupying about three or four acres of the narrowed limits, and a part of this marshy place had been used by the prisoners as a sink, and excrement covered the ground, the scent arising from which was suffocating. The ground allotted to our ninety was near the edge of this plague-spot, and how we were to live through the warm summer weather in the midst of such fearful surroundings, was more than we cared to think of just then.

Further descriptions of the camp can be found in the diary of Ransom Chadwick, a member of the 85th New York Infantry Regiment. Chadwick and his regimental mates were taken to the Andersonville Prison, arriving on April 30, 1864. An extensive and detailed diary was kept by John L. Ransom of his time as a prisoner at Andersonville.

Father Peter Whelan arrived on 16 June 1864 to muster the resources of the Catholic church and help provide relief to the prisoners.

The dead line 
At Andersonville, a light fence known as "the dead line" was erected approximately  inside the stockade wall. Anyone crossing or even touching this "dead line" was shot without warning by sentries in the guard platforms (called "pigeon roosts") on the stockade. (It is considered possible, although not established, that the modern term deadline in the sense of a time limit derives from this.)

Health problems 

At this stage of the war, Andersonville Prison was frequently under-supplied with food. By 1864, civilians in the Confederacy and soldiers of the Confederate Army were all struggling to obtain sufficient quantities of food. The shortage of fare was suffered by prisoners and Confederate personnel alike within the fort, but the prisoners received less than the guards. Unlike the captives, the guards did not become severely emaciated or suffer from scurvy as a consequence of vitamin C deficiency due to a lack of fresh fruits and vegetables in their diet.  The poor diets and resulting scurvy was likely a major cause of the camp's high mortality rate, as well as dysentery and typhoid fever. These resulted from filthy living conditions and poor sanitation. The only source of drinking water was a creek that also served as the camp's latrine. It was filled at all times with fecal matter from thousands of sick and dying men. Even when sufficient quantities of supplies were available, they were of poor quality and inadequately prepared.

There were no new outfits given to prisoners, whose own clothing was often falling to pieces. In some cases, garments were taken from the dead. John McElroy, a prisoner at Andersonville, recalled "Before one was fairly cold his clothes would be appropriated and divided, and I have seen many sharp fights between contesting claimants".

Although the prison was surrounded by forest, very little wood was allowed to the prisoners for warmth or cooking. This, along with the lack of utensils, made it almost impossible for the prisoners to cook the meager food rations they received, which consisted of poorly milled cornflour. During the summer of 1864, Union prisoners suffered greatly from hunger, exposure and disease. Within seven months, about a third had died from dysentery and scurvy; they were buried in mass graves, the standard practice for Confederate prison authorities at Andersonville. In 1864, the Confederate Surgeon General asked Joseph Jones, an expert on infectious disease, to investigate the high mortality rate at the camp. He concluded that it was due to "scorbutic dysentery" (bloody diarrhea caused by vitamin C deficiency). In 2010, the historian Rosemary Drisdelle said that hookworm disease, a condition not recognized or known during the Civil War, was the major cause of many of the fatalities among the prisoners.

Survival and social networks 
At the time of the Civil War, the concept of a prisoner of war camp was still new. It was not until 1863 that President Lincoln demanded a code of conduct be instituted to guarantee prisoners of war an entitlement to food and medical treatment and to protect them from enslavement, torture and murder. Andersonville did not provide its occupants with these guarantees; the prisoners at Andersonville, without any sort of law enforcement or protections, functioned more closely to a primitive society than a civil one. As such, survival often depended on the strength of a prisoner's social network within the prison. A prisoner with friends inside Andersonville was more likely to survive than a lone prisoner. Social networks provided prisoners with food, clothes, shelter, moral support, trading opportunities and protection against other prisoners. One study found that a prisoner having a strong social network within Andersonville "had a statistically significant positive effect on survival probabilities, and that the closer the ties between friends as measured by such identifiers as ethnicity, kinship and the same home town, the bigger the effect."

The Raiders 
A group of prisoners, calling themselves the Andersonville Raiders, attacked their fellow inmates to steal food, jewellery, money and clothing. They were armed mostly with clubs and killed to get what they wanted. Another group started up, organized by Peter "Big Pete" Aubrey, to stop the larceny, calling themselves "Regulators". They caught nearly all of the Raiders, who were tried by the Regulators' judge, Peter McCullough, and a jury, selected from a group of new prisoners. This jury, upon finding the Raiders guilty, set punishment that included running the gauntlet, being sent to the stocks, ball and chain and, in six cases, hanging.

The conditions were so poor that in July 1864, Captain Henry Wirz paroled five Union soldiers to deliver a petition signed by the majority of Andersonville's prisoners asking that the Union reinstate prisoner exchanges to relieve the overcrowding and allow prisoners to leave these terrible conditions. That request was denied. The petitioners, who had sworn to return, reported this to their comrades.

Deaths
During the war, 45,000 prisoners were received at Andersonville prison; of these nearly 13,000 died. The nature and causes of the deaths are a source of controversy among historians. Some contend that the deaths resulted from Confederate policy and were war crimes against Union prisoners, while others state that they resulted from disease promoted by severe overcrowding; the widespread food shortage in the Confederate States; the prison officials' incompetence; and the breakdown of the prisoner exchange system, caused by the Confederacy's refusal to include black Union troops in the exchanges. The stockade became severely overcrowded.

During the war, disease was the primary cause of death in both armies. Infectious disease was a chronic problem, due to poor sanitation in regular as well as prison camps.

Dorence Atwater 
A young Union prisoner, Dorence Atwater, was chosen to record the names and numbers of the dead at Andersonville, for use by the Confederacy and the federal government after the war ended. He believed, correctly, the federal government would never see the list. Therefore, he sat next to Henry Wirz, who was in charge of the prison pen, and secretly kept his own list among other papers. When Atwater was released, he put the list in his bag and took it through the lines without being caught. It was published by the New York Tribune when Horace Greeley, the paper's owner, learned the federal government had refused the list and given Atwater much grief. Atwater believed that the commanding officer Wirz had been trying to ensure that Union prisoners would be rendered unfit to fight if they survived the prison.

Newell Burch 
Prisoner of war (POW) Newell Burch also recorded Andersonville's poor conditions in his diary. A member of the 154th New York Volunteer Infantry, Burch was captured on the first day of the Battle of Gettysburg; he was first imprisoned at Belle Isle in Richmond, Virginia and then Andersonville. He is credited with having been the longest-held Union prisoner of war during the Civil War, having survived a total of 661 days in Confederate hands. His diary is in the collection of the Dunn County Historical Society in Menomonie, Wisconsin; a mimeographed copy is held by the Wisconsin Historical Society.

Prisoner population

Escapes 
Planning an escape from this camp was routine among the thousands of prisoners. Most men formed units to burrow out of the camp using tunnels. The locations of the tunnels would aim towards nearby forests fifty feet from the wall. Once out, escape was nearly impossible due to the poor health of prisoners. Prisoners caught trying to escape were denied rations, chain ganged, or killed. Playing dead was another method of escape. The death rate of the camp being around a hundred per day made disposing of bodies a relaxed procedure by the guards. Prisoners would pretend to be dead and carried out to the row of dead bodies outside of the walls. As soon as night fell the men would get up and run. Once Wirz learned of this practice he ordered an examination by surgeons on all bodies taken out of the camp.

Confederate records show that 351 prisoners (about 0.7% of all inmates) escaped, though many were recaptured. The US Army lists 32 as returning to Union lines; of the rest, some likely simply returned to civilian life without notifying the military, while others probably died.

Confederacy's offer to release prisoners 
In the latter part of the summer of 1864, the Confederacy offered to conditionally release prisoners if the Union would send ships to retrieve them (Andersonville is inland, with access possible only via rail and road). In the autumn of 1864, after the Battle of Atlanta, all the prisoners who were well enough to be moved were sent to Florence Stockade (near Florence, South Carolina) and Camp Lawton (near Millen, Georgia). At Millen, better arrangements prevailed, and prisoners were transported by rail to the port of Savannah. After General William Tecumseh Sherman began his march to the sea and destroyed Millen, the remaining prisoners were returned to Andersonville.

Liberation 
Andersonville Prison was liberated by the Union Army in May 1865, with the prisoners inside being found and described as "human skeletons amid hellish scenes of desolation".

Trial

After the war, Henry Wirz, commandant of the inner stockade at Camp Sumter, was tried by a military tribunal on charges of war crimes. The trial was presided over by Union General Lew Wallace and featured chief Judge Advocate General (JAG) prosecutor Norton Parker Chipman.

A number of former prisoners testified about conditions at Andersonville, many accusing Wirz of specific acts of cruelty, for some of which Wirz was not even present in the camp. The court also considered official correspondence from captured Confederate records. Perhaps the most damaging was a letter to the Confederate surgeon general by Dr. James Jones, who in 1864 was sent by Richmond to investigate conditions at Camp Sumter. Jones had been appalled by what he found, and reported he vomited twice and contracted influenza from the single hour he'd toured the camp. His graphically detailed report to his superiors all but closed the case for the prosecution.

Wirz presented evidence that he had pleaded to Confederate authorities to try to get more food and that he had tried to improve the conditions for the prisoners inside. He was found guilty, and sentenced to death. On November 10, 1865, he was hanged. Wirz was one of two men executed after the war for war crimes and the only Confederate official; the other was the guerrilla Champ Ferguson. The revelation of the prisoners' sufferings was one of the factors that affected public opinion in the North regarding the South after the close of the Civil War.

Aftermath

In 1890, the Grand Army of the Republic, Department of Georgia, bought the site of Andersonville Prison through membership and subscriptions. In 1910, the site was donated to the federal government by the Woman's Relief Corps (auxiliary to the Grand Army of the Republic).

National Prisoner of War Museum 
The National Prisoner of War Museum opened in 1998 as a memorial to all American prisoners of war. Exhibits use art, photographs, displays, and video presentations to depict the capture, living conditions, hardships, and experiences of American prisoners of war in all periods. The museum also serves as the park's visitor center.

Andersonville National Cemetery 

The cemetery is the final resting place for the Union prisoners who died while being held at Camp Sumter/Andersonville as POWs. The prisoners' burial ground at Camp Sumter has been made a national cemetery. It contains 13,714 graves, of which 921 are marked "unknown".

As a National Cemetery, it is also used as a burial place for more recent veterans and their dependents.

Visitors can walk the  site of Camp Sumter, which has been outlined with double rows of white posts. Two sections of the stockade wall have been reconstructed: the north gate and the northeast corner.

Depictions in popular culture 
 Andersonville (1955) is a novel by MacKinlay Kantor concerning the Andersonville prison. It won the Pulitzer Prize for Fiction in 1956.
 The Andersonville Trial (1970), a PBS television adaptation of a 1959 Broadway play. It depicts the 1865 trial of Andersonville commandant Henry Wirz.
 The TV movie Andersonville (1996), directed by John Frankenheimer, tells the story of the notorious Confederate prison camp.
 
 Max R. Terman's Hiram's Honor: Reliving Private Terman's Civil War (2009, Hillsboro, KS: TESA Books), is an historical novel.
 In the TV series Hell on Wheels, the villainous character Thor Gundersen is a survivor of Andersonville; his experiences there have left deep mental scars and fuel his hatred of the protagonist, Confederate veteran Cullen Bohannon, the railway foreman. In the depths of his madness, Gundersen begins calling himself "Mr. Anderson".
 This camp is briefly mentioned in The Good, the Bad and the Ugly, as Angel Eyes (Lee Van Cleef) uses it as an excuse to rule his camp with an iron fist. This is one of the most visible historical errors (anachronisms) in the film, since it is set during the New Mexico Campaign, two years before the opening of the prison.
 The novel Inferno, by Larry Niven and Jerry Pournelle, contains a brief reference to the camp; in the novel, set in Hell, Billy the Kid remarks that "the guy who ran the Andersonville prison camp" is being eternally tortured on an island in Phlegethon, the river of boiling blood.
 A novel written in 2014 by Tracy Groot entitled The Sentinels of Andersonville depicts some of the Historical players such as Capt. Henry Wirz and General John Winder and fictional prisoners in Andersonville Prison as rebel neighbors, attempting to help the prisoners, were vilified by the town of Americus, GA.
 Stephen Vincent Benet's epic John Brown's Body refers to Andersonville and Wirz's trial as one of two incidents emblematic of the Civil War POW camps.
 In the seventh episode of Ken Burns's 1990 PBS TV miniseries The Civil War, "1864, Most Hallowed Ground", a segment entitled "Can Those Be Men?" is devoted to Andersonville; its title derives from a quote by Walt Whitman (voiced in the film by Garrison Keillor) which runs in part: "Can those be men? Are they not really corpses?...The dead there are not to be pitied as much as some of the living that come from there – if they can be called living."
 Sebastian Barry's 2016 novel, Days Without End, includes a section in which the protagonists are captured as Union soldiers and held at the Andersonville camp. Prisoners are described as being "Harrowed by hunger and ploughed through by sickness."
 In the 1959 war film The Horse Soldiers, the camp is often mentioned by Colonel John Marlowe (John Wayne), as his Union cavalry brigade is behind Confederate lines and in constant danger of being captured.
 Episode 1321 of the CBS Radio Mystery Theater aired April 28, 1982, "The Ghost of Andersonville," details the tragic events of the relationship between Cal Russell (played by Tony Roberts), a former prisoner of the notorious camp, and Union General Lysander Cutler. Russell refuses to support Cutler's bid for the presidency due to a deep-seated grudge over the general's ineptitude as an army leader.
 During Season 9 Episode 2 of the genealogy series Finding Your Roots, aired January 10, 2023, Henry Louis Gates, Jr. disclosed to actor Jeff Daniels that one of his grandfathers, Melvin H. Storms, fought at the Battle of Gettysburg and had subsequently been taken prisoner. He survived incarceration at the Andersonville Prison.

Gallery

Monuments

See also 

 American Civil War prison camps
 Camp Douglas
 Dix–Hill Cartel, the agreement reached in July 1862 to regulate prisoner of war exchanges
 Elmira Prison
 Florence Stockade
 Immortal Six Hundred
 Libby Prison
 Camp Lawton
 Salisbury Prison
 Washington Street Military Prison

Notes

References

Further reading

Scholarly studies
 Cloyd, Benjamin G. Haunted by Atrocity: Civil War Prisons in American Memory. (Louisiana State University Press, 2010)
 Costa, Dora L; Kahn, Matthew E. "Surviving Andersonville: The Benefits of Social Networks in POW Camps," American Economic Review (2007) 97#4 pp. 1467–1487. econometrics
 Domby, Adam H. "Captives of Memory: The Contested Legacy of Race at Andersonville National Historic Site" Civil War History (2017) 63#3 pp. 253–294 online
 Futch, Ovid. "Prison Life at Andersonville,"  Civil War History (1962) 8#2 pp. 121–35 in Project MUSE
 Futch, Ovid. History of Andersonville Prison (1968)
 Marvel, William. Andersonville: The Last Depot (University of North Carolina Press, 1994) excerpt and text search
 Pickenpaugh, Roger. Captives in Blue: The Civil War Prisons of the Confederacy (2013) pp. 119–66
 Rhodes, James, History of the United States from the Compromise of 1850, vol. V. New York: Macmillan, 1904.
 Silkenat, David. Raising the White Flag: How Surrender Defined the American Civil War. Chapel Hill: University of North Carolina Press, 2019. .

Primary and other sources
 Chipman, Norton P. The Horrors of Andersonville Rebel Prison. San Francisco: Bancroft, 1891.
 Genoways, Ted & Hugh H. Genoways (eds.). A Perfect Picture of Hell: Eyewitness Accounts by Civil War Prisoners from the 12th Iowa. Iowa City: University of Iowa Press, 2001.
 McElroy, John. Andersonville: A Story of Rebel Military Prisons Toledo: D.R. Locke, 1879.
 Ransom, John. Andersonville Diary. Auburn, NY: Author, 1881.
 Ranzan, David, ed. Surviving Andersonville: One Prisoner's Recollections of the Civil War's Most Notorious Camp. Jefferson, NC: McFarland and Company, 2013.
 Spencer, Ambrose. A Narrative of Andersonville. New York: Harper, 1866.
 Stevenson, R. Randolph. The Southern Side, or Andersonville Prison. Baltimore: Turnbull, 1876.
 Voorhees, Alfred H. The Andersonville Prison Diary of Alfred H. Voorhees. 1864.

External links 
 

 Andersonville National Historic Site at NPS.gov – official site
 Andersonville Civil War Prison Historical Background
 
  – 
 "WWW Guide to Civil War Prisons" (2004)
 "The Rebel Prison Pen at Andersonville, Georgia" – transcript of an 1874 newspaper article by a former prison guard
 
 Newspaper articles and clippings about the Andersonville Prison at Newspapers.com

American Civil War cemeteries
American Civil War museums in Georgia (U.S. state)
American Civil War prison camps
American Civil War sites in Georgia (U.S. state)
Cemeteries on the National Register of Historic Places in Georgia (U.S. state)
Defunct prisons in Georgia (U.S. state)
Historic districts on the National Register of Historic Places in Georgia (U.S. state)
Military and war museums in Georgia (U.S. state)
Museums in Macon County, Georgia
National Historic Sites in Georgia (U.S. state)
Prison museums in Georgia (U.S. state)
Protected areas of Sumter County, Georgia
Military monuments and memorials in the United States
War crimes in the United States
Institutions accredited by the American Alliance of Museums
Protected areas of Macon County, Georgia
1864 establishments in Georgia (U.S. state)
American Civil War on the National Register of Historic Places
National Register of Historic Places in Macon County, Georgia
Temporary populated places on the National Register of Historic Places